Kelly Demetrius Skipper (born July 25, 1967) is an American football coach who is the running backs coach for the Buffalo Bills of the National Football League (NFL).  Previously, he was the running backs coach under head coach Dennis Allen for the Oakland Raiders from 2009 to 2014. Skipper spent two summers doing NFL coaching internships with the Seattle Seahawks and Washington Redskins.  He played running back at Fresno State.

Personal
His father, Jim Skipper, is a retired veteran NFL assistant coach. He has a brother, Tim Skipper, who is currently the linebackers coach at Fresno State.

References

Living people
Fresno State Bulldogs football coaches
California Golden Bears football coaches
UCLA Bruins football coaches
Washington State Cougars football coaches
Oakland Raiders coaches
People from Brawley, California
Jacksonville Jaguars coaches
1967 births
Buffalo Bills coaches